The Ritz Cinema, also known as the Ritz Theatre, is a heritage-listed cinema located at 43 St Pauls Street, in the Sydney suburb of Randwick in the City of Randwick local government area of New South Wales, Australia. It was designed by Aaron Bolot and built in 1937 by C. & B. J. Williams. It was added to the New South Wales State Heritage Register on 2 April 1999. The architect, Aaron Bolot, is known for his classic art deco buildings throughout Sydney, such as his commissions for grand apartment buildings in Potts Point.

History

Indigenous history
Pre-1780s the local Aboriginal people in the area used the site for fishing and cultural activities; rock engravings, grinding grooves and middens remain in evidence. In 1789 Governor Arthur Phillip referred to "a long bay", which became known as Long Bay. Aboriginal people are believed to have inhabited the Sydney region for at least 20,000 years. The population of Aboriginal people between Palm Beach and Botany Bay in 1788 has been estimated to have been 1500. Those living south of Port Jackson to Botany Bay were the Cadigal people who spoke Dharug, while the local clan name of Maroubra people was "Muru-ora-dial". By the mid nineteenth century the traditional owners of this land had typically either moved inland in search of food and shelter, or had died as the result of European disease or confrontation with British colonisers.

Colonial history
One of the earliest land grants in this area was made in 1824 to Captain Francis Marsh, who received  bounded by the present Botany and High Streets, Alison and Belmore Roads. In 1839 William Newcombe acquired the land north-west of the present town hall in Avoca Street.

Randwick takes its name from the town of Randwick, Gloucestershire, England. The name was suggested by Simeon Pearce (1821–86) and his brother James. Simeon was born in the English Randwick and the brothers were responsible for the early development of both Randwick and its neighbour, Coogee. Simeon had come to the colony in 1841as a 21 year old surveyor. He built his Blenheim House on the  he bought from Marsh, and called his property "Randwick". The brothers bought and sold land profitably in the area and elsewhere. Simeon campaigned for construction of a road from the city to Coogee (achieved in 1853) and promoted the incorporation of the suburb. Pearce sought construction of a church modelled on the church of St. John in his birthplace. In 1857 the first St Jude's stood on the site of the present post office, at the corner of the present Alison Road and Avoca Street.

Randwick was slow to progress. The village was isolated from Sydney by swamps and sandhills, and although a horse-bus was operated by a man named Grice from the late 1850s, the journey was more a test of nerves than a pleasure jaunt. Wind blew sand over the track, and the bus sometimes became bogged, so that passengers had to get out and push it free. From its early days Randwick had a divided society. The wealthy lived elegantly in large houses built when Pearce promoted Randwick and Coogee as a fashionable area. But the market gardens, orchards and piggeries that continued alongside the large estates were the lot of the working class. Even on the later estates that became racing empires, many jockeys and stablehands lived in huts or even under canvas. An even poorer group were the immigrants who existed on the periphery of Randwick in a place called Irishtown, in the area now known as The Spot, around the junction of St.Paul's Street and Perouse Road. Here families lived in makeshift houses, taking on the most menial tasks in their struggle to survive.

In 1858 when the NSW Government passed the Municipalities Act, enabling formation of municipal districts empowered to collect rates and borrow money to improve their suburb, Randwick was the first suburb to apply for the status of a municipality. It was approved in February 1859, and its first Council was elected in March 1859.

Randwick had been the venue for sporting events, as well as duels and illegal sports, from the early days in the colony's history. Its first racecourse, the Sandy Racecourse or Old Sand Track, had been a hazardous track over hills and gullies since 1860. When a move was made in 1863 by John Tait, to establish Randwick Racecourse, Simeon Pearce was furious, especially when he heard that Tait also intended to move into Byron Lodge. Tait's venture prospered, however and he became the first person in Australia to organise racing as a commercial sport. The racecourse made a big difference to the progress of Randwick. The horse-bus gave way to trams that linked the suburb to Sydney and civilisation. Randwick soon became a prosperous and lively place, and it still retains a busy residential, professional and commercial life.

Today, some of the houses have been replaced by home units. Many European migrants have made their homes in the area, along with students and workers at the nearby University of NSW and the Prince of Wales Hospital.

The Ritz Theatre

Aaron Bolot was born in 1900 in Crimea. To escape persecution against Jewish people, Bolot migrated to Brisbane in 1911. Bolot enrolled at Brisbane's Central Technical College to study architecture and graduated in 1926. Upon graduation he was awarded the Queensland Institute of Architects Gold medal. Following graduation Bolot worked for Hollinshed and Gailey and whilst there assisted on two notable theatre projects, the Melbourne Comedy and Brisbane Regent.

In 1930 Bolot moved to Sydney and set up his own practice. He completed several building projects during the decade ranging from houses and multi-storeyed apartments buildings to incinerators and theatres. During this time Bolot worked with Walter Burley Griffin. Bolot produced drawings for Griffin for two incinerators, one located at Pyrmont and the other at Willoughby.

Bolot designed two theatres, the Hoyts Theatre at Goulburn described at that time as "an outstanding example of its genre" and the Astra at Wyong. In 1937 Bolot designed the Randwick Ritz for his clients Randwick Estate Ltd. At the same time he also designed the Regal Theatre at Gosford.

In 1938 Bolot designed Ashdown located at 96 Eilzabeth Bay Road, Elizabeth Bay. Consisting of thirty-six apartments it is regarded as an outstanding building of interwar functionalist style. Later in 1938 Bolot remodelled the Melba Theatre in Melbourne which was renamed the New Liberty Theatre. In 1941 he remodelled West's Nowra Theatre.

In 1942 Bolot joined the army and served as a Warrant Officer in Egypt and New Guinea. After the war Bolot resumed work as an architect and in 1948 designed the landmark apartment building located at 17 Wylde Street, Potts Point. Designed in 1948 and completed in late 1951 due to shortages in building materials, it was one of the largest buildings of any type to be constructed in the inner city area following the Second World War. In 1965 Bolot married and lived with his wife in Gommerah an apartment block located at Darling Point designed by him in 1957. In 1989 Bolot died leaving a legacy of innovative architecture.

Since its construction, the cinema has been owned by, among others, the Hoyts cinema group and the Brigidine Sisters (an order of nuns running the adjacent Brigidine College). In the late 1980s the current owners planned to demolish the existing cinema and to redevelop the site. However, Randwick City Council and the then Minister for Planning intervened and a Permanent Conservation Order was imposed on the Ritz building in March, 1993. The current owners refurbished the building in the late 1990s, adding additional cinemas to the original single principal cinema theatre in order to allow the Ritz to survive in the era of competition with larger multiplex cinema chains.

Description
The Ritz Theatre is constructed of brick with a galvanised iron roof supported on angle steel trusses. It has seating capacity of about 900.

The Randwick Ritz was built on two levels in the Inter-war Art Deco linear geometric style. The rendered facade reflects the early skyscraper style concept with a strong vertical emphasis expressed by vertical linear ribbing and reeding, as well as the stepped parapet. This feeling of strong verticality was even further emphasised by the deliberate stepping of the street awning over the entrance foyer doors. The awning itself retains its original pressed metal soffit, or underside lining, which is wholly decorated with characteristic geometric Art Deco motifs in a regular repeated pattern.

The Art Deco linear geometric style is relieved internally by curved walls to the main stair, half landing and curved corners in the foyer and first floor lounge. The auditorium is distinctive through its Art Deco lights in two panels of nine wall lights to either side of the screen and the continuous ground glass box lighting with its chevron motif. The plaster decoration to the walls and ceiling is in geometric patterns in low relief with extensive use of grills and reveals. The detailing to the gilded plaster speaker boxes, which flank the main screen is particularly fine.

Australian Film Walk of Fame

In 2008, the Australian Film Walk of Fame was created outside the Ritz, with plaques honouring members of the Australian film industry. The walk was initiated by Randwick Council, with support from the Coogee Arts Festival and The Ritz.

Condition

As at 1 October 1997, the physical condition is good. Archaeological potential is low.

Modifications and dates
Built in 1937. Alterations made about 1954 to accommodate a wide screen. Interior redecorated around 1963.

Heritage listing 
The Randwick Ritz is a good example of a picture theatre showing the smaller scaling and reduced decoration often applied to suburban theatres. It is one of the few surviving examples of the hundreds of cinema which were built during the 1930s, the most creative period of cinematic design in Australia It has many fine pieces of Art Deco decoration in a restrained Art Deco setting. The Ritz Theatre is a record of the cinema culture of the 1930s. The building has an excellent ability to interpret aspirations, uses, tastes and importance of cinema in the society of the 1930s It is the last known surviving theatre by A.M. Bolot. Following demolition or alteration of most suburban picture theatres, it is now an important and rare survival.

Ritz Theatre was listed on the New South Wales State Heritage Register on 2 April 1999 having satisfied the following criteria.

The place is important in demonstrating the course, or pattern, of cultural or natural history in New South Wales.

The Ritz Theatre is one of the few surviving examples of the hundreds of cinema which were built during the 1930s, the most creative period of cinematic design in Australia.

It is an excellent example of the later expressionist style of cinemas showing the evolution of the theatre from the picture palaces of the 1920s, the French inspired art deco designs of early 1930s to the German influenced expressionist futuristic cinemas of the late 1930s.

It is an example of cinema design and philosophy reflecting the influences of the German dominated cinematic world of the 1920s rather than American Hollywood which has had a mjor and overpoering impact on the world for the past 50 years.

The place is important in demonstrating aesthetic characteristics and/or a high degree of creative or technical achievement in New South Wales.

The Ritz Theatre is aesthetically significant because the exterior and interior detailing and remaining fittings and finishes are excellent example of the 1930s crafts and skills which are of high aesthetic quality.

It is a very good example of A. M. Bolot's cinema architecture, and is the last surviving of his cinemas. His early association with the architects Walter burley Griffin and Hollinshed and Gailey has particular significance for tracing the evolution of cinema design in Australia and represents a major cultural item in Australia's cinema history.

The place has a strong or special association with a particular community or cultural group in New South Wales for social, cultural or spiritual reasons.

The Ritz Theatre is socially significant because is a record of the cinema culture of the 1930s. These values have undergone a metamorphosis since the 1930s. The building has an excellent ability to interpret aspirations, uses, tastes and importance of cinema in the society of the 1930s.

The place has potential to yield information that will contribute to an understanding of the cultural or natural history of New South Wales.

The Ritz Theatre is of scientific significance because it is an excellent record of a 1930s cinema which is substantially intact with all associated acoustic and ventilation panels, lighting systems, original materials and fabrics and projection room.

The place possesses uncommon, rare or endangered aspects of the cultural or natural history of New South Wales.

The Randwick Ritz has a major rarity value. The Randwick Ritz is one of the very few which remain in Sydney. it is comparable in architectural importance to the Orpheum in Cremorne.

Register of the National Estate (defunct)
In 1997, the Ritz Cinema was placed on the (now defunct) Register of the National Estate by the Australian Heritage Council. That (defunct) record notes that:
The Ritz Cinema is the only one of three remaining theatres of this style in an unaltered state still used as a cinema in New South Wales and is one of the few surviving examples of the hundreds of cinemas which were built during the 1930s, one of the most creative periods of cinematic design in Australia. ... The Ritz, which has operated almost continuously as a movie theatre since 1937, has social values as a community cultural entertainment centre in the Randwick area. The place is also highly valued by the Art Deco Society. ... The Ritz is significant for its intact and well detailed Art Deco design and is a prominent element in the St Paul's Road urban precinct ...

See also

Australian non-residential architectural styles

References

Bibliography

Attribution

External links

 

Cinemas in Sydney
Art Deco architecture in Sydney
Theatres in Sydney
Theatres completed in 1937
1937 establishments in Australia
Mass media companies established in 1937
Buildings and structures completed in 1937
New South Wales State Heritage Register
Randwick, New South Wales
Entertainment venues in New South Wales
Articles incorporating text from the New South Wales State Heritage Register